Annupamaa  is an Indian playback singer from Tamil Nadu. She is known especially for the song "Chandralekha" (Konjam Nilavu) from Thiruda Thiruda. She is also trained in Carnatic music and a 6th grade solo pianist from Trinity College London. She adores the singing styles of both Asha Bhosle in Bollywood and  k S Chitra in South Indian music industry.

Personal life
Annupamaa was born in Chennai, Tamil Nadu, India on 2 September 1968.  She got training in Carnatic music from the age of four and she began singing in school competitions from the age of eight. She had her school education from St. Anthony's Senior Secondary School, New Delhi and took her BA Degree in English from Kamala Nehru College, New Delhi in 1989. She dropped out of the Mass Communication Course from the Indian Institute of Mass Communication in New Delhi following her passion to become a singer. Anupama is married to J. Murali Krishnan, Executive Vice-president and National Creative Director of Optima Response
and they live in Chennai.

Career

Annupamaa used to take part in college competitions during her days as a student of Mass Communications. As a copy trainee in an ad agency, she had a chance to participate in an Ad Utsav. Annupamaa made herself a successful ad jingle composer and singer in the early nineties itself. She has been a part of many successful ad jingles by music director A. R. Rahman, who was then A. S. Dilip Kumar. The list of her most successful ads include ads for Ponds Dreamflower Talc and Soap, Medimix soap, Tatia Resorts, Diplomat Whisky, AVT Deepika Coconut Oil, Trupti range of products and Aavin Goodness ice cream.

Rahman made her sing July Maddham Vanthal from Pudhiya Mugam in 1993, which became a hit. But the break-in her career came through the song Chandralekha from Thiruda Thiruda which had music set by A. R. Rahman himself. This song is even now regarded as one of the best techno-electronic song ever. Her passionate singing won her several accolades and she was even nicknamed as Chandralekha Anupama. After the success of Chandralekha, she became one of the most sought after singers in Tamil Nadu. However, she remained selective and sang the songs, which she believed extraordinary. In 1994, she got another big hit through Halla Gulla from Bombay. She had to wait for two years to get yet another career break, which came through the song Mercury Pookkal from Ratchagan. Though this song was not received well as Chandralekha, it too won her and Rahman, several accolades. She was an additional vocalist in the 1998 hit song Dil Se Re from Dil Se.. and 2003 hit song Break The Rules (Maro Maro') from Boys. She got a Star Screen Award for Best Female Playback nomination for her soulful singing in the song Yeh Raat from Aks. Her latest hit songs include two tracks from the musical film Jaane Tu... Ya Jaane Na, Pappu Can't Dance and Nazrein Milaana. She is the captain of the reality show Sangeeta Mahayuddham, telecasted on Sun TV from 26 June onwards.

She has now sung in all the South Indian languages, Hindi and English. She has also recorded a French ditty for a Malayalam film. "It's all due to my knowledge of Sanskrit which makes it a cakewalk to sing in any lingo", she says. In the last few years, she has been learning piano and has completed 6th grade from Trinity College of Music. She is now busy with her own debut studio album. She says, "It will be out sometime next year. The lyrics are being penned by a very good poet. They will be full of beautiful imagery, a mix of poetry and peppy English words." After that album, she is planning a promo tour of South East Asia – Jakarta, Indonesia, and Malaysia.

She was nominated for best playback singer in star screen awards in 2002 for her rendition of the song Yeh Raat in the film Aks''.

In June 2013, she was the first playback singer from India to compose and sing an anthem for the first china south Asia expo held in Kunming China and win an award for one of the best entries out of a 177 entries world over.

She has also sung the Tamil and Telugu versions of the Walt Disney musical animation "Aladdin" called "A Whole New World".

As a composer, she has composed several radio spots and jingles for various brands and companies like TVS, RMKV, VIVEL, INDIAN OIL, etc..

The latest project she has worked on is for an NGO "We for WE" based in Jalandhar who work for women empowerment and present globally in 18 countries besides India. She has composed and sung an anthem in Hindi On women empowerment called SHAAN SE JEE. The anthem song is going to be launched show in the presence of top dignitaries of the political world.

Annupamaa is the Ambassador and Team Leader for The South India Chapter of We for WE and has done several programs for this NGO which works towards raising awareness of the rights and fights for the respect of women worldwide. The main focus of Annupamaa is nutrition health and fitness in the empowerment of women. A medical camp was organised on International Women's Day  March 8, 2015 for underprivileged women to launch We for WE in the South.

Annupamaa is also trained in acting for stage and camera and has taken part in theatre productions in Chennai, a notable one being a performance of "Songs from under the river" by Anis Mojgani, a contemporary award-winning slam poet of Iranian American descent.

Notable songs

References

External links
  
 
 Article from Hindu www.thehindu.com/features/.../song-for-south-asia/article4966412.ece

1967 births
Living people
Singers from Chennai
Indian women playback singers
Tamil singers
Tamil-language singers
Kannada playback singers
Tamil playback singers
Malayalam playback singers
Bollywood playback singers
Hindi-language singers
Telugu playback singers
Women musicians from Tamil Nadu
20th-century Indian women singers
20th-century Indian singers